Oeoniella is a genus of flowering plants from the orchid family, Orchidaceae. It contains two known species, both native to various islands in the Indian Ocean.

Oeoniella aphrodite (Balf.f. & S.Moore) Schltr. - Seychelles, Mauritius, Rodrigues
Oeoniella polystachys (Thouars) Schltr. -  Réunion, Mauritius, Comoros, Madagascar

References

  2005. Handbuch der Orchideen-Namen. Dictionary of Orchid Names. Dizionario dei nomi delle orchidee. Ulmer, Stuttgart
  (Eds) (2014) Genera Orchidacearum Volume 6: Epidendroideae (Part 3); page 419 ff., Oxford: Oxford University Press.

External links

Angraecinae
Orchids of Africa
Orchids of Madagascar
Vandeae genera